The Hagerstown Police Department is a full-service, 24/7 law enforcement agency serving a population of 40,612 (US Census Estimate 2010) in  within the municipality of Hagerstown, Maryland, county seat of Washington County.  Hagerstown closely borders Pennsylvania, West Virginia, and Virginia.

History

There have been six line-of-duty deaths within the HPD.
Officer Charles E. Gall, EOW October 10, 1866
Officer Murphy E. Flory, EOW June 26, 1901
Officer John C. Middlekauff, EOW August 17, 1914
Chief of Police George W. Fridinger, EOW February 28, 1918
Officer Lynwood N. Vewcomer, EOW June 3, 1951
Officer Donald Ralph Kline, EOW December 13, 1975

Organization
Colonel Victor Brito is Hagerstown's current Chief of Police .

See also 

 List of law enforcement agencies in Maryland

References

External links
Hagerstown Police Department homepage

Hagerstown, Maryland
Hagerstown